Rędziny  is a village in the administrative district of Gmina Szczekociny, within Zawiercie County, Silesian Voivodeship, in southern Poland.

The village has a population of 50.

References

Villages in Zawiercie County